Helmut Hubacher (15 April 1926 – 19 August 2020) was a Swiss politician, a member of the Social Democratic Party of Switzerland.

Biography
After spending his early career with Swiss Federal Railways, he became a secretary with the Syndicate of Public Services. In 1963, he became Editor-in-Chief of Basler Abend Zeitung. From 1956 to 1968, he served as a Grand Councillor in the Canton of Basel-Stadt, from 1963 to 1997, he served on the National Council, and he served as President of the Social Democratic Party from 1975 to 1990.

References

1926 births
2020 deaths
20th-century Swiss politicians
21st-century Swiss politicians
Social Democratic Party of Switzerland politicians
People from Emmental District